Below a list of all national champions in the Men's javelin event in track and field from several countries since 1980.

Australia

1980: Manfred Rohkämper
1981: Mike O'Rourke (NZL)
1982: Garry Calvert
1983: Dave Dixon
1984: Dave Dixon
1985: John Stapylton-Smith (NZL)
1986: Murray Keen
1987: Gavin Lovegrove (NZL)
1988: Ben Hodgson
1989: Gavin Lovegrove (NZL)
1990: Jean-Paul Lakafia (NCL)
1991: Yki Laine (FIN)
1992: Cameron Graham
1993: Andrew Currey
1994: Andrew Currey
1995: Andrew Currey
1996: Andrew Currey
1997: Adrian Hatcher
1998: Andrew Currey
1999: Andrew Currey
2000: Andrew Currey
2001: William Hamlyn-Harris
2002: Andrew Currey
2003: Andrew Currey
2004: William Hamlyn-Harris
2005: Oliver Dziubak
2006: Stuart Farquhar (NZL)
2007: Jarrod Bannister
2008: Mike Hazle
2009: Stuart Farquhar (NZL)

Belarus

1992: Unknown
1993: Nikolay Kosyanok
1994: Oleg Gotsko
1995: Sergey Gordienko
1996: Andrey Khodasevich
1997: Vladimir Sasimovich
1998: Aleksandr Kulesh
1999: Igor Lisovskiy
2000: Vladimir Sasimovich
2001: Pavel Stasyuk
2002: Pavel Stasyuk
2003: Vladimir Sasimovich
2004: Mehdi Ravaei (IRI)
2005: Nikolay Vasilyachov
2006: Vadim Yautukhovich

Belgium

1970: Louis Fortamps
1971: Lode Wijns
1972: Lode Wijns
1973: Lode Wijns
1974: Lode Wijns
1975: Lode Wijns
1976: Lode Wijns
1977: Lode Wijns
1978: Tony Duchateau
1979: Lode Wijns
1980: Luc Carlier
1981: Tony Duchateau
1982: Paul Deroo
1983: Tony Duchateau
1984: Jean-Paul Schlatter
1985: Jean-Paul Schlatter
1986: Frank Stockmans
1987: Jean-Paul Schlatter
1988: Jean-Paul Schlatter
1989: Frank Stockmans
1990: Jerome Putzeys
1991: Jean-Paul Schlatter
1992: Frank Stockmans
1993: Jean-Paul Schlatter
1994: Mark Van Mensel
1995: Johan Kloeck
1996: Mark Van Mensel
1997: Johan Kloeck
1998: Mark Van Mensel
1999: Johan Kloeck
2000: Mark Van Mensel
2001: Mark Van Mensel
2002: Mark Van Mensel
2003: Mark Van Mensel
2004: Mark Van Mensel
2005: Mark Van Mensel
2006: Loic Lemaitre
2007: Tom Goyvaerts
2008: Tom Goyvaerts
2009: Thomas Smet
2010: Tom Goyvaerts
2011: Tom Goyvaerts
2012: Tom Goyvaerts
2013: Thomas Smet
2014: Timothy Herman
2015: Timothy Herman
2016: Timothy Herman

Canada

1980: Gheorghe Megelea
1981: Gheorghe Megelea
1982: Phil Olsen
1983: Phil Olsen
1984: Laslo Babits
1985: Laslo Babits
1986: Peter Massfeller
1987: Mike Olma
1988: Mike Mahovlich
1989: Mike Mahovlich
1990: Stephen Feraday
1991: Louis Breault
1992: Stephen Feraday
1993: Stephen Feraday
1994: Larry Steinke
1995: Erin Bevans
1996: Erin Bevans
1997: Erin Bevans
1998: Erin Bevans
1999: Erin Bevans
2000: Scott Russell
2001: Scott Russell
2002: Scott Russell
2003: Scott Russell
2004: Scott Russell
2005: Scott Russell
2006: Trevor Snyder
2007: Scott Russell
2008: Scott Russell
2009: Kyle Nielsen
2010: Curtis Moss
2011: Scott Russell
2012: Curtis Moss
2013: Kyle Nielsen
2014: Raymond Dykstra
2015: Caleb Jones

PR China

1988: Ji Zhanzheng
1989: Wang Zhongwen
1990: Tang Linhua
1991: Zhang Lianbiao
1992: Zhang Lianbiao
1993: Zhang Lianbiao
1994: Zhang Lianbiao
1995: Zhang Lianbiao
1996: Zhang Lianbiao
1997: Gao Wenxu
1998: Li Rongxiang
1999: Li Rongxiang
2000: Zhang Lianbiao
2001: Li Rongxiang
2002: Li Rongxiang
2003: Li Rongxiang
2004: Chen Qi
2005: Chen Qi

Czech Republic

1993: Miloš Steigauf
1994: Jan Železný
1995: Vladimír Novácek
1996: Jan Železný
1997: Patrick Landmesser
1998: Patrick Landmesser
1999: Patrick Landmesser
2000: Miroslav Guzdek
2001: Miroslav Guzdek
2002: Miroslav Guzdek
2003: Miroslav Guzdek
2004: Radek Pejrimovský
2005: Petr Belunek
2006: Jan Syrovátko

Denmark

1980: Bent Larsen
1981: Bent Larsen
1982: Jørgen Jelstrøm
1983: Carsten Boysen
1984: Jørgen Jelstrøm
1985: Kenneth Petersen
1986: Kenneth Petersen
1987: Kenneth Petersen
1988: Kenneth Petersen
1989: Kenneth Petersen
1990: Arnt Pedersen
1991: Arnt Pedersen
1992: Kenneth Petersen
1993: Kenneth Petersen
1994: Kenneth Petersen
1995: Thomas Jørgensen
1996: Thomas Jørgensen
1997: Kenneth Petersen
1998: Kenneth Petersen
1999: Richard Askholm Knudsen
2000: Richard Askholm Knudsen
2001: Richard Askholm Knudsen
2002: Richard Askholm Knudsen
2003: Richard Askholm Knudsen
2004: Richard Askholm Knudsen
2005: Richard Askholm Knudsen
2006: Lars Møller
2007: Lars Møller

Estonia

1917*: Aleksander Klumberg
1918*: Aleksander Klumberg
1919*: Aleksander Klumberg
1920: Aleksander Klumberg
1921: Aleksander Klumberg
1922: Aleksander Klumberg
1923: Aleksander Klumberg
1924: Aleksander Klumberg
1925: Johann Meimer
1926: Johann Meimer
1927: Aleksander Klumberg
1928: Johannes Schütz
1929: Gustav Sule
1930: Gustav Sule
1931: Gustav Sule
1932: Gustav Sule
1933: Gustav Sule
1934: Gustav Sule
1935: Gustav Sule
1936: Artur Mägi
1937: Gustav Sule
1938: Gustav Sule
1939: Artur Mägi
1940: Friedrich Issak
1941: -
1942: Paul Vares
1943: Endel Nääb
1944: Johannes Püss
1945: Harry Vallmann
1946: Friedrich Issak
1947: Friedrich Issak
1948: Ants Maiste
1949: Harry Vallmann
1950: Roland Ilves
1951: Ants Maiste
1952: Harry Vallmann
1953: John Põldsam
1954: Heino Tiik
1955: John Põldsam
1956: Charles Vallmann
1957: Charles Vallmann
1958: Mart Paama
1959: Charles Vallmann
1960: Charles Vallmann
1961: Mart Paama
1962: Charles Vallmann
1963: Mart Paama
1964: Charles Vallmann
1965: Mart Paama
1966: Toomas Savi
1967: Vambola Poljakov
1968: Mart Paama
1969: Mart Paama
1970: Mart Paama
1971: Mart Paama
1972: Mart Paama
1973: Mart Paama
1974: Ain Veenpere
1975: Heino Puuste
1976: Ain Veenpere
1977: Agu Rukki
1978: Kalju Mägi
1979: Heino Puuste
1980: Toivo Moorast
1981: Heino Puuste
1982: Toivo Moorast
1983: Toivo Moorast
1984: Ülo Rukki
1985: Marek Kaleta
1986: Olavi Malts
1987: Sulev Lepik
1988: Marek Kaleta
1989: Marek Kaleta
1990: Toivo Moorast
1991: Sulev Lepik
1992: Marek Kaleta
1993: Donald Sild
1994: Donald Sild
1995: Marek Kaleta
1996: Margus Kübar
1997: Donald Sild
1998: Heiko Väät
1999: Andrus Värnik
2000: Andrus Värnik
2001: Heiko Väät
2002: Rainer Raudsepp
2003: Andrus Värnik
2004: Andrus Värnik
2005: Andrus Värnik
2006: Andrus Värnik
2007: Risto Mätas
2008: Mihkel Kukk
2009: Tanel Laanmäe
2010: Ahti Peder
2011: Mihkel Kukk
2012: Risto Mätas
2013: Risto Mätas
2014: Tanel Laanmäe
2015: Magnus Kirt
2016: Tanel Laanmäe
2017: Magnus Kirt
2018: Magnus Kirt
2019: Magnus Kirt
2020: Ranno Koorep
2021: Ergo Tamm
2022: Magnus Kirt

* unofficial championships

Finland

1980: Pentti Sinersaari
1981: Antero Toivonen
1982: Arto Härkönen
1983: Pentti Sinersaari
1984: Tero Saviniemi
1985: Seppo Räty
1986: Seppo Räty
1987: Tapio Korjus
1988: Tapio Korjus
1989: Seppo Räty
1990: Seppo Räty
1991: Seppo Räty
1992: Juha Laukkanen
1993: Seppo Räty
1994: Juha Laukkanen
1995: Seppo Räty
1996: Seppo Räty
1997: Sami Saksio
1998: Aki Parviainen
1999: Aki Parviainen
2000: Aki Parviainen
2001: Aki Parviainen
2002: Aki Parviainen
2003: Aki Parviainen
2004: Tero Pitkämäki
2005: Tero Pitkämäki
2006: Tero Pitkämäki
2007: Tero Pitkämäki
2008: Tero Järvenpää
2009: Teemu Wirkkala
2010: Tero Pitkämäki
2011: Ari Mannio
2012: Antti Ruuskanen
2013: Tero Pitkämäki
2014: Antti Ruuskanen
2015: Antti Ruuskanen
2016: Tero Pitkämäki
2017: Tero Pitkämäki
2018: Oliver Helander
2019: Lassi Etelätalo
2020: Lassi Etelätalo

France

1980: Serge Leroy
1981: Penisio Lutui
1982: Péta Tauhavili
1983: Jean-Paul Lakafia
1984: Jean-Paul Lakafia
1985: Philippe Lecurieux
1986: Charlus Bertimon
1987: Pascal Lefèvre
1988: Pascal Lefèvre
1989: Pascal Lefèvre
1990: Pascal Lefèvre
1991: Pascal Lefèvre
1992: Pascal Lefèvre
1993: Pascal Lefèvre
1994: Pascal Lefèvre
1995: Pascal Lefèvre
1996: Alain Storaci
1997: Bouna Diop (SEN)
1998: Gaëtan Siakinuu-Schmidt
1999: Tommi Huotilainen (FIN)
2000: Laurent Dorique
2001: Laurent Dorique
2002: Gaëtan Siakinuu-Schmidt
2003: Dominique Pausé
2004: Stuart Farquhar (NZL)
2005: David Brisseault
2006: Vitolio Tipotio
2007: Vitolio Tipotio
2008: Laurent Dorique
2009: Vitolio Tipotio
2010: Jerome Haeffler
2011: Laurent Dorique
2012: Killian Durechou
2013: Vitolio Tipotio
2014: Jérémy Nicollin
2015: Jerome Haeffler
2016: Killian Durechou
2017: Jean-Baptiste Collet
2018: Jérémy Nicollin

Germany

East Germany

1980: Detlef Michel
1981: Gerald Weiss
1982: Detlef Michel
1983: Detlef Michel
1984: Uwe Hohn
1985: Uwe Hohn
1986: Detlef Michel
1987: Detlef Michel
1988: Silvio Warsönke
1989: Volker Hadwich
1990: Raymond Hecht

West Germany

1980: Michael Wessing
1981: Helmut Schreiber
1982: Klaus Tafelmeier
1983: Klaus Tafelmeier
1984: Klaus Tafelmeier
1985: Klaus Tafelmeier
1986: Wolfram Gambke
1987: Klaus Tafelmeier
1988: Peter Blank
1989: Klaus-Peter Schneider
1990: Peter Blank

Unified Germany

1991: Klaus Tafelmeier
1992: Volker Hadwich
1993: Raymond Hecht
1994: Raymond Hecht
1995: Boris Henry
1996: Raymond Hecht
1997: Boris Henry
1998: Boris Henry
1999: Raymond Hecht
2000: Boris Henry
2001: Peter Blank
2002: Raymond Hecht
2003: Boris Henry
2004: Boris Henry
2005: Christian Nicolay
2006: Christian Nicolay
2007: Stephan Steding
2008: Tino Häber
2009: Mark Frank
2010: Matthias de Zordo
2011: Matthias de Zordo
2012: Thomas Röhler
2013: Thomas Röhler
2014: Thomas Röhler
2015: Thomas Röhler

Great Britain

1980: Miklós Németh (HUN)
1981: Mike O'Rourke (NZL)
1982: David Ottley
1983: Mike O'Rourke (NZL)
1984: David Ottley
1985: David Ottley
1986: David Ottley
1987: Mick Hill
1988: David Ottley
1989: Steve Backley
1990: Mick Hill
1991: Mick Hill
1992: Steve Backley
1993: Colin Mackenzie
1994: Mick Hill
1995: Mick Hill
1996: Nick Nieland
1997: Mark Roberson
1998: Steve Backley
1999: Steve Backley
2000: Steve Backley
2001: Mark Roberson
2002: Mick Hill
2003: Mick Hill
2004: Steve Backley
2005: Nick Nieland
2006: Nick Nieland
2007: Nick Nieland

Hungary

1980: Miklós Németh
1981: Miklós Németh
1982: Ferenc Paragi
1983: Miklós Németh
1984: András Temesi
1985: András Temesi
1986: Tamás Bolgár
1987: László Stefán
1988: Attila Bareith
1989: László Stefán
1990: Ferenc Knausz
1991: László Palotai
1992: Lajos Varga
1993: József Belák
1994: József Belák
1995: József Belák
1996: József Belák
1997: József Belák
1998: József Belák
1999: Gergely Horváth
2000: Gergely Horváth
2001: Gergely Horváth
2002: Gergely Horváth
2003: Gergely Horváth
2004: Gergely Horváth
2005: Gergely Horváth
2006: Csongor Olteán
2007: Csongor Olteán
2008: Csongor Olteán
2009: Csongor Olteán
2010: Krisztián Török
2011: Krisztián Török

India

2020: Neeraj Chopra

Ireland

1980: Peter Ruffli
1981: Harry Southern
1982: Mark O'Connor
1983: Kevin McBrearty
1984: Terry McHugh
1985: Terry McHugh
1986: Terry McHugh
1987: Terry McHugh
1988: Terry McHugh
1989: Terry McHugh
1990: Terry McHugh
1991: Terry McHugh
1992: Terry McHugh
1993: Terry McHugh
1994: Terry McHugh
1995: Terry McHugh
1996: Terry McHugh
1997: Terry McHugh
1998: Terry McHugh
1999: Terry McHugh
2000: Terry McHugh
2001: Terry McHugh
2002: Terry McHugh
2003: Terry McHugh
2004: Terry McHugh
2005: Michael McConkey (NIR)
2006: Niall Tuckey

Italy

1980: Vanni Rodeghiero
1981: Agostino Ghesini
1982: Agostino Ghesini
1983: Agostino Ghesini
1984: Agostino Ghesini
1985: Fabio Michielon
1986: Agostino Ghesini
1987: Fabio de Gaspari
1988: Fabio de Gaspari
1989: Fabio de Gaspari
1990: Fabio de Gaspari
1991: Fabio de Gaspari
1992: Fabio de Gaspari
1993: Fabio de Gaspari
1994: Carlo Sonego
1995: Giuseppe Soffiato
1996: Fabio de Gaspari
1997: Fabio de Gaspari
1998: Armin Kerer
1999: Carlo Sonego
2000: Armin Kerer
2001: Alberto Desiderio
2002: Paolo Valt
2003: Francesco Pignata
2004: Francesco Pignata
2005: Francesco Pignata
2006: Francesco Pignata
2007: Daniele Crivellaro
2008: Roberto Bertolini
2009: Roberto Bertolini

2010: Roberto Bertolini
2011: Leonardo Gottardo
2012: Giacomo Puccini
2013: Norbert Bonvecchio
2014: Norbert Bonvecchio
2015: Roberto Bertolini
2016: Norbert Bonvecchio
2017: Mauro Fraresso
2018: Mauro Fraresso
2019: Mauro Fraresso

Japan

1980: Toshihiko Takeda
1981: Masami Yoshida
1982: Yoshinori Kuriyama
1983: Masami Yoshida
1984: Masami Yoshida
1985: Kazuhiro Mizoguchi
1986: Masanori Amano
1987: Kazuhiro Mizoguchi
1988: Kazuhiro Mizoguchi
1989: Kazuhiro Mizoguchi
1990: Dmitriy Polyunik (RUS)
1991: Patrik Bodén (SWE)
1992: Masami Yoshida
1993: Takahiro Yamada
1994: Kazuhiro Mizoguchi
1995: Kazuhiro Mizoguchi
1996: Kazuhiro Mizoguchi
1997: Toro Ue
1998: Toro Ue
1999: Mikio Tamura
2000: Yukifumi Murakami
2001: Yukifumi Murakami
2002: Yukifumi Murakami
2003: Yukifumi Murakami
2004: Yukifumi Murakami
2005: Yukifumi Murakami
2006: Yukifumi Murakami
2007: Yukifumi Murakami
2008: Yukifumi Murakami
2009: Yukifumi Murakami
2010: Yukifumi Murakami
2011: Yukifumi Murakami
2012: Genki Dean

Latvia

 1991: Normunds Pildavs
 1992: Normunds Pildavs
 1993: Mārcis Štrobinders
 1994: Mārcis Štrobinders
 1995: Mārcis Štrobinders
 1996: Mārcis Štrobinders
 1997: Ēriks Rags
 1998: Voldemārs Lūsis
 1999: Ēriks Rags
 2000: Ēriks Rags
 2001: Ēriks Rags
 2002: Ēriks Rags
 2003: Ēriks Rags
 2004: Voldemārs Lūsis
 2005: Ainārs Kovals
 2006: Ēriks Rags

2008: Vadims Vasiļevskis
2009: Ēriks Rags
2010: Ēriks Rags

Lithuania

1990: Kestutis Mikša
1991: Tom Pukstys (USA)
1992: Arûnas Jurkšas
1993: Arûnas Jurkšas
1994: Arûnas Jurkšas
1995: Arûnas Jurkšas
1996: Arûnas Jurkšas
1997: Arûnas Jurkšas
1998: Arûnas Jurkšas
1999: Arûnas Jurkšas
2000: Arûnas Jurkšas
2001: Tomas Intas
2002: Arûnas Jurkšas
2003: Arûnas Jurkšas
2004: Tomas Intas
2005: Tomas Intas
2006: Tomas Intas
2007:
2008:
2009: Tomas Intas

Netherlands

1980: Bert Smit
1981: Bert Smit
1982: Jeroen van der Meer
1983: Bert Smit
1984: Bert Smit
1985: Bert Smit
1986: Marcel Bunck
1987: Jeroen van der Meer
1988: Jeroen van der Meer
1989: Jeroen van der Meer
1990: Jeroen van der Meer
1991: Jeroen van der Meer
1992: Johan van Lieshout
1993: Johan van Lieshout
1994: Johan van Lieshout
1995: Johan van Lieshout
1996: Johan van Lieshout
1997: Johan van Lieshout
1998: Johan van Lieshout
1999: Johan van Lieshout
2000: Oscar Schermer
2001: Oscar Schermer
2002: Elliott Thijssen
2003: Elliott Thijssen
2004: Elliott Thijssen
2005: Bjorn Blommerde
2006: Elliott Thijssen
2007: Elliott Thijssen
2008: Bjorn Blommerde
2009: Bjorn Blommerde
2010: Bjorn Blommerde
2011: Bjorn Blommerde
2012: Bjorn Blommerde
2013: Bjorn Blommerde
2014: Jurriaan Wouters
2015: Daan Meyer
2016: Mart ten Berge

New Zealand

1980: Mike O'Rourke
1981: Mike O'Rourke
1982: Mike O'Rourke
1983: Dave Hookway
1984: John Stapylton-Smith
1985: John Stapylton-Smith
1986: John Stapylton-Smith
1987: Gavin Lovegrove
1988: Mike O'Rourke
1989: John Stapylton-Smith
1990: Gavin Lovegrove
1991: Gavin Lovegrove
1992: Gavin Lovegrove
1993: Gavin Lovegrove
1994: Gavin Lovegrove
1995: Andrew Harrison
1996: Diggory Brooke
1997: Diggory Brooke
1998: Diggory Brooke
1999: Vladimir Ovchinnikov (RUS)
2000: James Goulding (FIJ)
2001: Andrew Harrison
2002: Joachim Kiteau (NCL)
2003: Stuart Farquhar
2004: Park Jae-Myong (KOR)
2005: Stuart Farquhar
2006: Stuart Farquhar
2007: Stuart Farquhar
2008: Stuart Farquhar
2009: Stuart Farquhar
2010: Stuart Farquhar
2011: Stuart Farquhar
2012: Stuart Farquhar
2013: Stuart Farquhar
2014: Stuart Farquhar
2015: Stuart Farquhar
2016: Stuart Farquhar

Norway

1980: Per Erling Olsen
1981: Per Erling Olsen
1982: Per Erling Olsen
1983: Per Erling Olsen
1984: Per Erling Olsen
1985: Narve Hoff
1986: Øystein Slettevold
1987: Narve Hoff
1988: Reidar Lorentzen
1989: Reidar Lorentzen
1990: Arne Indrebø
1991: Reidar Lorentzen
1992: Pål Berntsen
1993: Arne Indrebø
1994: Håvard Johansen
1995: Arne Indrebø
1996: Pål Arne Fagernes
1997: Arne Indrebø
1998: Pål Arne Fagernes
1999: Pål Arne Fagernes
2000: Ronny Nilsen
2001: Andreas Thorkildsen
2002: Pål Arne Fagernes
2003: Andreas Thorkildsen
2004: Andreas Thorkildsen
2005: Andreas Thorkildsen
2006: Andreas Thorkildsen

Poland

1980: Dariusz Adamus
1981: Michał Wacławik
1982: Michał Wacławik
1983: Dariusz Adamus
1984: Stanisław Witek
1985: Mirosław Szybowski
1986: Stanisław Górak
1987: Mirosław Witek
1988: Mirosław Witek
1989: Stanisław Witek
1990: Stanisław Witek
1991: Czesław Uhl
1992: Rajmund Kółko
1993: Tomasz Damszel
1994: Mirosław Witek
1995: Rajmund Kółko
1996: Dariusz Trafas
1997: Rajmund Kółko
1998: Dariusz Trafas
1999: Dariusz Trafas
2000: Grzegorz Krasiński
2001: Dariusz Trafas
2002: Dariusz Trafas
2003: Dariusz Trafas
2004: Rajmund Kółko
2005: Dariusz Trafas
2006: Dariusz Trafas
2007: Igor Janik
2008: Igor Janik
2009: Adrian Markowski
2010: Igor Janik
2011: Łukasz Grzeszczuk
2012: Igor Janik
2013: Hubert Chmielak
2014: Łukasz Grzeszczuk
2015: Marcin Krukowski
2016: Marcin Krukowski
2017: Marcin Krukowski
2018: Marcin Krukowski
2019: Marcin Krukowski

Portugal

1980: Mário Silva
1981: Mário Silva
1982: Carlos Cunha
1983: Paulo Santos
1984: Paulo Santos
1985: Carlos Cunha
1986: Carlos Cunha
1987: Paulo Santos
1988: Carlos Cunha
1989:Carlos Cunha
1990: Carlos Cunha
1991: Carlos Cunha
1992: Carlos Cunha
1993: Carlos Cunha
1994: Carlos Cunha
1995: João Reis
1996: João Reis
1997: Carlos Cunha
1998: Filipe Ventura
1999: Filipe Ventura
2000: João Reis
2001: Filipe Ventura
2002: João Reis
2003: André Medeiros
2004: Elias Leal
2005: Filipe Ventura
2006: Filipe Ventura
2007: Elias Leal
2008: Elias Leal
2009: Luís Almeida
2010: Luís Almeida
2011: Tiago Aperta
2012: Tiago Aperta
2013: Tiago Aperta
2014: Tiago Aperta
2015: Tiago Aperta
2016: Tiago Aperta
2017: Tiago Aperta

Russia

1992: Lev Shatilo
1993: Yuriy Rybin
1994: Yuriy Rybin
1995: Vladimir Ovchinnikov
1996: Sergey Makarov
1997: Sergey Makarov
1998: Yuriy Rybin
1999: Yuriy Rybin
2000: Sergey Makarov
2001: Sergey Makarov
2002: Aleksandr Ivanov
2003: Sergey Makarov
2004: Aleksandr Ivanov
2005: Sergey Makarov
2006: Sergey Makarov

South Africa

1980: Herman Potgieter
1981: Herman Potgieter
1982: Herman Potgieter
1983: Herman Potgieter
1984: Herman Potgieter
1985: Chris de Beer
1986: Chris de Beer
1987: Hendrik Liebenberg
1988: Herman Potgieter
1989: Tom Petranoff (USA)
1990: Tom Petranoff (USA)
1991: Tom Petranoff
1992: Tom Petranoff
1993: Tom Petranoff
1994: Louis Fouché
1995: Phillip Spies
1996: Louis Fouché
1997: Marius Corbett
1998: Marius Corbett
1999: Marius Corbett
2000: Marius Corbett
2001: Marius Corbett
2002: Gerhardus Pienaar
2003: Gerhardus Pienaar
2004: Gerhardus Pienaar
2005: Lohan Rautenbach
2006: Gerhardus Pienaar

Spain 
Spain's national champions are as follows.

1980: Miguel Cánovas
1981: Augusto Lao
1982: Augusto Lao
1983: Antonio Lago
1984: Antonio Lago
1985: Juan José Rosell
1986: Julián Sotelo
1987: Antonio Lago
1988: Julián Sotelo
1989: Enric Bassols
1990: Julián Sotelo
1991: Julián Sotelo
1992: Julián Sotelo
1993: Raimundo Fernández
1994: Julián Sotelo
1995: Julián Sotelo
1996: Raimundo Fernández
1997: Antonio Esteban
1998: Alejandro García
1999: Gustavo Dacal
2000: Gustavo Dacal
2001: Eduardo Veranes
2002: Gustavo Dacal
2003: Gustavo Dacal
2004: Gustavo Dacal
2005: Gustavo Dacal
2006: Gustavo Dacal
2007: Gustavo Dacal
2008: Gustavo Dacal
2009: Gustavo Dacal
2010: Rafael Baraza
2011: Rafael Baraza
2012: Jordi Sánchez
2013: Manuel Uriz
2014: Jordi Sánchez

Sweden

1980: Lars Henriksson
1981: Olavi Kolehmainen
1982: Kenth Eldebrink
1983: Olavi Kolehmainen
1984: Kenth Eldebrink
1985: Dag Wennlund
1986: Dag Wennlund
1987: Peter Borglund
1988: Peter Borglund
1989: Peter Borglund
1990: Peter Borglund
1991: Dag Wennlund
1992: Patrik Bodén
1993: Patrik Bodén
1994: Patrik Bodén
1995: Patrik Bodén
1996: Peter Borglund
1997: Patrik Bodén
1998: Patrik Bodén
1999: Patrik Bodén
2000: Mikael Snällfot
2001: Daniel Ragnvaldsson
2002: Daniel Ragnvaldsson
2003: Daniel Ragnvaldsson
2004: Mikael Snällfot
2005: Daniel Ragnvaldsson
2006: Magnus Arvidsson
2007: Magnus Arvidsson
2008: Magnus Arvidsson
2009: Daniel Ragnvaldsson
2010: Daniel Ragnvaldsson
2011: Kim Amb
2012: Kim Amb

Ukraine 

1992: Andriy Maznichenko
1993: Andriy Novikov
1994: Andriy Maznichenko
1995: Andriy Uglov
1996: Andriy Uglov
1997: Andriy Maznichenko
1998: Serhiy Volochay
1999: Yuriy Drozdov
2000: Oleh Stetsenko
2001: Oleh Stetsenko
2002: Oleh Stetsenko
2003: Oleh Stetsenko
2004: Oleh Stetsenko
2005: Oleh Stetsenko
2006: Roman Avramenko
2007: Oleh Stetsenko
2008: Roman Avramenko
2009: Oleksandr Pyatnytsya
2010: Dmytro Kosynskyy
2011: Oleksandr Pyatnytsya
2012: Oleksandr Pyatnytsya
2013: Yuriy Kushniruk
2014: Dmytro Kosynskyy
2015: Dmytro Kosynskyy
2016: Dmytro Kosynskyy
2017: Dmytro Sheremet
2018: Yuriy Kushniruk
2019: Oleksandr Nychyporchuk
2020: Oleksandr Nychyporchuk

United States

1980: Duncan Atwood
1981: Bruce Kennedy
1982: Bob Roggy
1983: Rod Ewaliko
1984: Curt Ransford
1985: Tom Petranoff
1986: Tom Petranoff
1987: Duncan Atwood
1988: Dave Stephens
1989: Mike Barnett
1990: Vince Labosky
1991: Mike Barnett
1992: Tom Pukstys
1993: Tom Pukstys
1994: Todd Riech
1995: Tom Pukstys
1996: Todd Riech
1997: Tom Pukstys
1998: Tom Pukstys
1999: Tom Pukstys
2000: Breaux Greer
2001: Breaux Greer
2002: Breaux Greer
2003: Breaux Greer
2004: Breaux Greer
2005: Breaux Greer
2006: Breaux Greer
2007: Breaux Greer
2008: Bobby Smith
2009: Chris Hill
2010: Sean Furey
2011: Mike Hazle
2012: Sam Humphreys
2013: Riley Dolezal
2014: Sean Furey
2015: Sean Furey
2016: Sean Furey
2017: Riley Dolezal

See also

References

 GBRathletics
 Dutch Results

Men
National
Javelin